Farrar House may refer to:

in the United States (by state then city)
Samuel Farrar House, Bangor, Maine, listed on the National Register of Historic Places (NRHP) in Penobscot County
Obediah Farrar House, Haywood, North Carolina, listed on the NRHP in Lee County
Farrar House (Hurley, South Dakota), listed on the NRHP in Turner County
Capt. H. P. Farrar House, Jackson, Tennessee, listed on the NRHP in Madison County
Farrar Homeplace, Shelbyville, Tennessee, listed on the NRHP in Bedford County
Farrar House (Ennis, Texas), listed on the NRHP in Ellis County
Roy and Margaret Farrar House, Houston, Texas, listed on the NRHP in Harris County